Jagdishpur is a nagar panchayat town of the district Bhojpur of the state of Bihar in eastern India. It was the capital of the eponymous Jagdishpur estate, ruled by Rajputs of the Ujjainiya clan. One of its rulers, Kunwar Singh, was a major figure in the Indian Rebellion of 1857, considered the leader of the rebellion in Bihar.

History 

Jagdishpur's association with the Ujjainiya Rajputs predates the foundation of the eponymous state by at least two centuries. Gajpati Sahi, who defeated Sher Shah Suri, fortified Jagdishpur and made it his capital before 1539. After Sher Shah's victory over the Mughal emperor Humayun at the Battle of Chausa in 1539, he elevated Gajpati Sahi, who had fought in the battle, to the title of Raja. However, Dilpati Sahi, a rival claimant to the throne, later allied with the Mughal emperor Akbar against Gajpati Sahi. Mughal sources state that a Mughal army sacked Jagdishpur in 1575 and captured Gajpati Sahi. Dilpati Sahi took advantage of this and attacked in 1577; Gajpati Sahi was killed in the ensuing battle. Akbar granted Dilpati Sahi the title of Raja and made him a mansabdar. Dilpati Sahi moved his capital away from Jagdishpur to Bihiya, although Jagdishpur remained his main military stronghold.

Later, the Ujjainiya ruler Pratap Mal, who ascended the throne in 1621 and was a contemporary of Shah Jahan, moved away from Jagdishpur.

Jagdishpur became the capital of a Rajput zamindari estate in 1702 by Sujan Sahi, an Ujjainiya Rajput who claimed descent from the earlier Paramara dynasty. Sujan Sahi's son and successor, Udwant Singh, expanded the borders of the estate by conquering neighbouring towns and villages. The governor of Bihar, Fakhr ud-Dawla, attempted to intervene, but Udwant Singh defeated the troops he sent.

Kunwar Singh brought a "new era of peace and prosperity, splendour and magnificence" to Jagdishpur. He renovated its fort and then started construction on a temple dedicated to Shiva, although this temple was never completed. He established markets and had many wells and reservoirs dug. Under his reign, Jagdishpur came to host various festivals and melās (fairs). In particular, the Shivratri festival was associated with a large melā that Kunwar Singh made mandatory for local merchants to attend.

Demographics 

According to the 2011 Census, the town of Jagdishpur had a population of 32,447, up from 28,085 in 2001. Of this, 75.2% were Hindus and 24.2% were Muslims, with all other religious groups accounting for the remaining 0.6%. The local literacy rate was 68.5%, which was the lowest in Bhojpur. 11.6% of the population was employed as cultivators, 26.7% as agricultural labourers, 6.9% as household industry workers, and 54.8% as other workers. The 11.6% of cultivators was the largest in Bhojpur.

The sub-district of Jagdishpur contained 79 villages in 2011, all of which had access to clean drinking water, 69 of which had schools, 30 of which had medical facilities, 24 of which had post offices, 56 of which had transport communications (bus, rail, or navigable waterways), 6 of which had banks, 18 of which had agricultural credit societies, 55 of which had pucca roads, and 35 of which had electricity. 81.5% of the total land area in Jagdishpur district was under cultivation, and 83% of the land under cultivation was irrigated.

576 people in the town Jagdishpur lived in slums, or 1.78% of the total population, which was the lowest in Bhojpur. There are two slums: Harijan Tola (Ward No. 4, population 300) and Chamar Tola (Ward No. 18, population 276).

Administration

The Jagdishpur sub-division (Tehsil) is headed by an IAS or state Civil service officer of the rank of Sub Divisional Magistrate (SDM).

Blocks
The Jagdishpur Tehsil is divided into 3 Blocks, each headed by a Block Development Officer (BDO). List of Blocks is as follows:
 Jagdishpur
 Behea
 Shahpur

List of villages 
Jagdishpur block contains the following 91 villages: (GP is Gram Panchayat).

See also
Veer Kunwar Singh Museum

References

External links
 http://bhojpur.bih.nic.in

Cities and towns in Bhojpur district, India